Lofn is a large relatively young impact crater on Jupiter's Galilean satellite Callisto. It was identified in 1997 and named after the goddess of marriage in Norse mythology. Located near the south pole of this moon, Lofn is classified as a flat floored or anomalous dome impact crater. It is superimposed on Adlinda multilayer structure obscuring about 30% of it. Another multi-ring structure—Heimdall is found to the south-west of Lofn.

Geologically Lofn is divided into a number of zones including the flat central floor zone, ring of massifs around it and the outer rings of bright and dark impact ejecta. Lofn was probably formed by an oblique impactor coming from the north-west. The relative shallowness of it is explained by either fragmentation of the impactor prior to the contact with the surface or by the post impact relaxation of Callisto's ductile crust.

Discovery and location
Lofn is one of the largest impact craters on Jupiter's moon Callisto. It is located in the southern hemisphere near the moon's south pole. The latitude and longitude of its center are 56°S and 23°W, respectively. The diameter of Lofn is about 180 km.

Lofn was first observed as a large high albedo circular feature (palimpsest) on low resolution images taken by Voyager spacecraft in 1979–1980. It was misidentified as a multi-ring structure and called Adlinda. Later in 1997 Galileo spacecraft took a number of high resolution images during its G2 and G8 orbits revealing a large flat-floored crater instead of multi-ring structure. It was determined that Adlinada is actually located slightly to the north-west of Lofn, which partially obscures it. Another multi-ring structure—Heimdall is situated to the south-east of Lofn.

Lofn was named after the goddess of marriage in Norse mythology.

Geology

The crater and the area immediately adjacent to it are divided in a number of geological units. They include an approximately circular and relatively bright central zone, an asymmetrical ring of mountainous and hummocky terrain around it, which is thought to correspond to the degraded crater rim. Beyond the crater rim there are two concentric outer rings made of bright and dark impact ejecta deposits.

The central zone of Lofn (100–120 km in diameter) corresponds to the crater floor, which lies about 0.6 km below the surrounding cratered plains. Lofn is a shallow crater as compared to other craters of similar size. This is the main reason why it is called a flat-floored or anomalous dome crater. Other examples of such craters are Doh and Bran. The hummocky terrain (rim) surrounding the floor consists of randomly distributed massifs as large as 50 km and has mottled appearance at some places. The width of the rim unit varies from about 18 km on the north-west side to more than 130 km on the south-east side.

The crater rim is encircled by a discontinuous ring of bright ejecta, which is asymmetric much like the rim itself. It is the thickest on the south-east side of Lofn, where it is found at the distance up to 300 km from the center of the crater. The outermost ring of ejecta is made predominantly of dark material. It is especially prominent on the north-west side of Lofn. The patches of ejecta associated with the crater can be found as far as 490 km from its center in the cratered plains.

The impact ejecta from Lofn partially buried nearby Adlinda multi-ring structure, which is situated at the distance of about 500 km to the north-west from it. To the south-east from Lofn there is another multi-ring structure—Heimdall, which geology, however, is poorly known due to the lack of images with the sufficient spatial resolution. The ejecta from Lofn partially covers the eastern part of it.

The central zone of Lofn, its rim and the ring of bright ejecta are water rich as was determined by the infrared spectroscopic observations by Galileo. Opposite is true for the dark material of the outer impact deposits, which appears to be relatively ice poor, but contains increased amounts of carbon dioxide.

Age and formation
Lofn is one of the youngest impact craters on Callisto. All its geological units contain much less small impact craters than the surrounding crater plains. The age of Lofn is estimated at 1.39–3.88 billion years depending on the assumed cratering rate in the past.

The significant asymmetry in distribution of the impact ejecta indicates that Lofn was formed by an oblique impact. The impactor probably came from the north-west. The shallowness of the crater may be related to the fragmentation of the impactor prior to the contact with the surface. A cluster of fragments is generally less efficient in excavation of the surface material than a single body. Another reason for the flat floor of Lofn is viscous relaxation of the crust after impact, which implies the existence of a layer of ductile material below the surface at the time of the impact. This soft material may be warm ice or even a subsurface ocean.

The impact initially caused the formation of a transient crater with the diameter of about 150 km and depth of about 50 km, which then relaxed forming the present crater with the final diameter of about 300 km. The impact probably penetrated through the dark water poor ejecta of Adlinda and Heimdell, then entered a water ice rich layer beneath it. This explains the distribution of the Lofn's ejecta. The outer rings of impact deposits around Lofn are made from the dark material, which was excavated first and accelerated to a high speed. After that the light water rich material was excavated from the depth, but with a lower speed forming the bright inner ring of ejecta.

See also
List of geological features on Callisto
List of craters on Callisto
Valhalla

References

Impact craters on Jupiter's moons
Surface features on Callisto (moon)